The 2018 SMP Russian Circuit Racing Series was the fifth season of the Russian Circuit Racing Series, organized by SMP Racing. It was the fourth season with TCR class cars.

Teams and drivers
Yokohama is the official tyre supplier.

Touring / TCR Russian Touring Car Championship
All teams are Russian-registered. All drivers, excepting Belarusian driver Vladislav Gorlach, raced under Russian racing license.

Super Production & Touring-Light
All teams and drivers are Russian-registered. All drivers raced under Russian racing license.

National
All teams are Russian-registered. All drivers raced under Russian racing license.

National Junior
All teams and drivers are Russian-registered. All drivers raced under Russian racing license.

Calendar and results
The 2018 schedule was announced on 12 October 2017, with all events scheduled to be held in Russia.

Championship standings

Scoring systems

Touring / TCR Russian Touring Car Championship
In the Russian Championship only pilots with a Russian racing license earn points, foreign pilots take part only in TCR Russia.

† – Drivers did not finish the race, but were classified as they completed over 75% of the race distance.

Touring / TCR Russian Touring Car Championship Team's Standing

Super Production

Super Production Team's Standing

Touring-Light

Touring Light Team's Standing

National

National Team's Standing

National-Junior

† – Drivers did not finish the race, but were classified as they completed over 75% of the race distance.

National-Junior Team's Standing

† – Drivers did not finish the race, but were classified as they completed over 75% of the race distance.

Footnotes

References

External links
 

Russian Circuit Racing Series
Russian Circuit Racing Series
Russian Circuit Racing Series
Russian Circuit Racing Series